Cserebere is a 1940 Hungarian comedy film directed by László Cserépy and starring Kálmán Latabár, Bella Bordy and Manyi Kiss.

Main cast
 Bella Bordy ...  Zsolnay Vera
 László Szilassy ...  Kerekes István
 Manyi Kiss ...  Panni, Vera barátnõje
 Kálmán Latabár ...  Tatár István
 Béla Mihályffi ...  Zsolnay (as Mihályffy Béla)
 Lajos Köpeczi Boócz ...  Gyárigazgató, Panni apja (as Köpeczy-Boócz Lajos)
 Zoltán Makláry ...  Cicvarek, fõpincér

External links

1940 films
1940s Hungarian-language films
Films directed by László Cserépy
1940 comedy films
Hungarian comedy films
Hungarian black-and-white films